The 1873 Texas gubernatorial election was held to elect the Governor of Texas. Incumbent Governor Edmund J. Davis ran for re-election to a second term, but was defeated by Democrat Richard Coke.

General election

Candidates
Richard Coke, former Associate Justice of the Texas Supreme Court (Democratic)
Edmund J. Davis, incumbent Governor (Republican)

Results

Aftermath
Within the month, the Texas Supreme Court ruled the election invalid in Ex parte Rodriguez, an extraordinary habeas corpus writ holding that the election had been unconstitutional because the polls were open for only one day. The new Constitution of 1869 had provided in Article III, Section 6, that all elections would be held "at the county seats of the several counties until otherwise provided by law; and the polls shall be opened for four days." Since the decision hinged crucially on the interpretation of the semi-colon, Texan historians have referred to the Court during this period as the "Semicolon Court," following its use by Oran Milo Roberts in his history of the Reconstruction period in the state.

The Ex parte Rodriguez ruling was never enforced. On January 15, disregarding the court's ruling and on the belief that Davis had stationed militiamen on the first floor of the Texas State Capitol, a group of Democrats entered using keys through the second to have Coke sworn into office. Davis summoned state troops to his defense, but upon their arrival, they joined Coke. Coke was sworn in and Davis swore for a truce; after President Ulysses S. Grant declined to send federal troops to aid his hold on the Capitol, Davis left office peacefully on January 19, bringing an effective end to the Reconstruction era in Texas. The Democratic Party would control Texas for more than a century; the next Republican Governor of the state was Bill Clements in 1979.

References

1866
Texas
1873 Texas elections